Jürgen Schröder (born 6 March 1940) is a retired German rower who was most successful in the eights. In this event he won a silver medal at the 1964 Summer Olympics and two European titles in 1964–1965.

References

1940 births
Living people
People from Zielona Góra
Sportspeople from Lubusz Voivodeship
Olympic rowers of the United Team of Germany
Rowers at the 1964 Summer Olympics
Olympic silver medalists for the United Team of Germany
Olympic medalists in rowing
West German male rowers
Medalists at the 1964 Summer Olympics
European Rowing Championships medalists